Wath Academy is a mixed secondary school on Sandygate in Wath-upon-Dearne in the Metropolitan Borough of Rotherham, South Yorkshire, England.

Admissions
The school is a specialist Language College, though it is non-selective. It has approximately 1,900 pupils between the ages of 11 and 18 on roll, including around 400 in the sixth form.

There is also a school council, which contributes to the decisions made by the head and speaks on behalf of all the students in all years. The school is within the Maltby learning trust.

History
The school was founded in 1923 as Wath Secondary School. Initially, the school was situated on Park Road, sharing the building of Park Road Infants School. The school was controlled by West Riding County Council.

Wath Secondary School rapidly outgrew its original accommodation, which led to lessons taking place in a number of borrowed locations scattered throughout Wath-upon-Dearne. To rectify this, the school moved into new, purpose-built accommodation on Sandygate in 1930. The institution became known as Wath Grammar School in 1931. The school was expanded with many new buildings and extensions in the early 1950s.

In January 1964 the school absorbed the neighbouring Wath (Park Road) Secondary Modern School. The expanded school initially still divided students into 'grammar' and 'basic' (secondary modern) streams and it was some time before it was formally designated a comprehensive school in 1972 and renamed Wath Comprehensive School in 1974 (which coincided with the school coming under the control of Rotherham Metropolitan Borough Council). The Park Road site initially continued to be used for the secondary modern stream, but later became a wing for first form (later known as Year 7) students. Due to further expansion, the school also occupied a corner of Wath Central Junior School site on Festival Road for a period, making a total of three sites.

On 31 December 1998, two students of the school, aged 14 and 15, died in a meningitis outbreak. Other students at the school were given antibiotics as a precaution. This was followed by an immunisation programme for all 1,700 students, which delayed the school reopening for lessons after the Christmas holiday by two days. The school itself was not thought to be the source of the outbreak.

The school was awarded language college status in 2001 and appended this to its name to become Wath Comprehensive School: A Language College.

Over time, the school's buildings, on all three sites, aged badly. In its 1997 report on the school, Ofsted described the accommodation as 'quite appalling', 'debilitating' and 'some of the worst working conditions the inspection team has seen'. The Inspectors highlighted 'damp seeping through the walls and ceilings', 'decaying door and window fittings', 'areas of crumbling asphalt and potholes' and 'falling plaster', before going on to conclude:

The school was rebuilt from 2003 to 2005, under the Private Finance Initiative (PFI) initiative. A new building on Sandygate, opened after Easter 2005, now makes up the majority of the school accommodation. Some parts of the school dating back from the 1950s (such as the hall and sports hall) survive, though none of the older 1930s buildings were retained. The loss of the oldest buildings was not without controversy, particularly the traditional 1930s part of the school which was set around two quadrangles. The Park Road site was demolished completely (along with the neighbouring Wath Park Infant School – a direct descendant of Park Road Infant School, where the secondary school was first based – which closed and merged with Wath Central Junior School to form Wath Central Primary School) and was replaced by housing. As a result of the rebuild, the school became single-site for the first time since the 1960s (though a road divides the main site from some of the playing fields). In 2008, the rebuilding was fully completed with the addition of a public leisure centre, including a swimming pool. The old caretaker's house on the school grounds is now used as the isolation block.

The school transitioned from being a community school to a foundation school, within the newly-formed Wath Learning Community Co-operative Trust, on 1 September 2013.

Less than a decade after it was built, the school had already outgrown its new building. The school has an official capacity of 1,740 students, but numbers have grown to over 1,900. Plans were drawn up for a 12 classroom overspill building, but the school has twice been denied the funds for construction. In 2014, Rotherham Metropolitan Borough Council chose not to fund the building because a third of Wath's students do not live within the local authority's boundaries, meaning the building would not, in the council's eyes, benefit the people of Rotherham enough. The funding therefore went to a similar building at Wickersley School and Sports College, which was not as overcapacity as Wath, but does draw all its students from the borough of Rotherham. In 2015, the school secured funding from the Department for Education for the building, but this was withdrawn as part of cuts in 2016. Later in 2016, the local council proposed an extension of five classrooms, in return for the school taking on 20 additional students a year. After many delays, construction of this extension began in July 2018 and was completed in February 2019.

Following the controversial Ofsted inspection in March 2017, the school was forced to academise (and leave its current foundation trust) against its will. The regional schools commissioner proposed Maltby Learning Trust as the academy sponsor in July 2017. Originally, the school was due to become an academy on 1 April 2018. After being delayed 12 times, the school finally academised – a full year late – on 1 April 2019 and became known as Wath Academy. It immediately became the largest and highest performing school in Maltby Learning Trust.

Traditions
The school's coat of arms, introduced in the 1940s, features a torch (in heraldry, this represents enlightenment) and a river (representing the River Dearne). The sixth form has its own coat of arms, which includes a miner's pickaxe (representing Wath-upon-Dearne's major industry when the arms were designed), a book (representing learning) and the river. The sixth form coat of arms was used for the whole school from the 1930s until the 1940s. After many years of varying appearance depending on the medium, both coats of arms were redrawn to be consistent across all uses in 2014; they retained the same underlying designs.

The school's colours are maroon and gold.

The school has six houses, named after ancient cities. The houses are Rome (founded 1923), Sparta (founded 1923), Athens (founded 1925), Carthage (founded 1925), Troy (founded 1927) and Thebes (founded 1927; suspended 1942; refounded 1958).

Since 1930, the school has elected a head boy and head girl from its Year 13 students. They are assisted by a team of deputy head boys and girls. In addition, Year 11 students can become prefects. Elected students receive a badge.

The school's uniform consists of a maroon blazer with a badge of the school coat of arms (a black blazer with a badge of the sixth form coat of arms for the sixth form), a white shirt/blouse, a school tie, black trousers/skirt and an optional v-neck jumper/cardigan. There are different ties for the main school, sixth form and prefects. Until the late 1990s, girls were forbidden from wearing trousers, though also did not have to wear blazers.

The school has its own student publication, The Torch (previously known (in reverse chronological order) as In Touch, The Wath Chronicle, The Wathonian and The Wath Magazine).

Some of the school's terminology is quite specific. For example, Physical Education is referred to as 'Games' and mock examinations are referred to as 'prelims' (short for 'preliminary examinations').

The school is notable for its size. It opened with 77 students in 1923, though had 520 students by 1929 (making it the fourth largest school in the West Riding local education authority area). Numbers then grew gradually, though were boosted to around 1,500 in the 1960s due to the closing of Wath (Park Road) Secondary Modern School. The school expanded again from the late 1970s, particularly boosted by the closure of the nearby Brampton Ellis Comprehensive School in 1985, and eventually reached 1,750 students. Numbers were at this level until as recently as 2007. However, further rises in student numbers (partially the sixth form, which has swelled from 300 to 400 students) have taken the total number of students to over 1,900: 300 students in each of Years 7 to 11 (rising to 320 from the 2018 intake and 330 from the 2019 intake onwards), with 200 in each year of the sixth form. As of 2013, the school is the 24th largest in England.

Academic performance
The school's results, whether measuring progress or raw attainment, are all above national averages.

In 2017, the school's Progress 8 score, which measures the progress made by students between the end of Key Stage 2 and Key Stage 4 (GCSE), was +0.07 (above the national average of -0.03, putting the school in the top third of the country). Its Attainment 8 score, which converts GCSE and other qualification grades into points, was 47.1 (above the national average of 44.6). The percentage of students achieving GCSE grades 9–5 in English and Maths was 41% (above the national average of 39.6%). The percentage of students achieving the English Baccalaureate was 35% (well above the national average of 19.7%), with entries for the EBacc being 70% (double the national average of 35%).

The sixth form results for 2017 showed an A Level/academic progress rate of +0.20 (in the top 10% of the country). The progress of vocational students was +0.77 (also in the top 10% of the country). The progress rates for students resitting GCSEs were +1.00 grades for English (in the top 3% of the country) and +0.88 grades for Maths (in the top 5% of the country).

Ofsted inspections
Since the commencement of Ofsted inspections in September 1993, the school has undergone six full inspections. This includes the highly controversial inspection of 2017, where the school's results – officially classed as 'average' by the Department for Education – were inexplicably called 'dire' by Ofsted. As Wath Academy is legally a new institution, the school currently has no Ofsted report or rating.

Headteachers/Principals
 A. T. L. Greer, September 1923–August 1940 (left to be an Air Force chaplain)
 John Ritchie, September 1940–May 1954 (died in office)
 Sylvia Swift, May 1954–April 1955 (acting headmistress)
 C. R. T. Saffell, April 1955–August 1972
 A. R. H. Murphy, September 1972–April 1977
 John Brothwell, April 1977–February 1991 (died in office)
 Derek E. Kirby, February 1991–August 1997 (acting until end of June 1991)
 Robert Godber, September 1997–August 2002
 Eric Sampson, September 2002–May 2003 (died in office)
 Jim Chisholm, May 2003–December 2003 (acting headteacher)
 Pat Ward, January 2004–August 2016
 Jon Taylor, September 2016–August 2020 (role name changed from 'headteacher' to 'principal' in September 2019)
 Liam Ransome, September 2020–present

Notable former pupils

 Ollie Banks, footballer
 David Bret, biographer
 Ryan Burrows (1999–2004), rugby union player
 Kenneth Burton  (1939–1943), biochemist
 Brandon Crook (2004–2011), drummer in The Sherlocks
 Kiaran Crook (2007–2014), singer and guitarist in The Sherlocks
 Sir Charles Curran (1933–1940), former Director-General of the BBC
 Rob Dawber (1967–1974), screenwriter
 Ian de Stains  (1960–1967), television continuity announcer and former executive director of the British Chamber of Commerce in Japan
 Alan Dobie (1941–1948), actor
 E. J. H. Ford, clinical scientist
 Toby Foster, radio presenter and comedian
 John Goldthorpe  (1946–1953), sociologist
 Bryan Gray  (1964–1971), former chairman of the Northwest Regional Development Agency
 William Hague, Baron Hague of Richmond,  (1973–1979), former leader of the Conservative Party and Foreign Secretary
 Peter Hardy, Baron Hardy of Wath (1942–1949), politician
 Jonathan Holmes, theatre director
 Kingsley James, footballer
 Brian Key (1958–1965), politician
 Harry Knutton  (1932–1939), former director-general of the City and Guilds of London Institute
 Alec Lazenby  (1938–1945), agronomist
 Dennis Maiden (1943–1950), former director-general of the Federation of Master Builders and chief executive of the CITB
 Paul McCue (1969–1970), military historian
 Ian McMillan (1967–1975), poet and radio presenter
 Kenneth Steer  (1925–1932), archaeologist
 Josh Wale (1999–2004), boxer
 Johnny Wardle (1934–1938), cricketer

Notable former staff
 Peter Cullen, javelinist

References

External links
 Wath Academy
 Former grammar school photo

Wath upon Dearne
Secondary schools in Rotherham
Academies in Rotherham
Educational institutions established in 1923
1923 establishments in England